Carbocromen (chromonar) is a vasodilator.

References

Vasodilators
Coumarin drugs
Carboxylate esters
Diethylamino compounds